Club Balonmano Zuazo Femenino, also known as Prosetecnisa Zuazo or Hotel Gran Bilbao–Prosetecnisa Zuazo Barakaldo for sponsorship reasons, is a women's handball club from Barakaldo in Spain. CBF Zuazo competes in the División de Honor, the top tier in the Spanish league system.

Season to season

European record

Team

Current squad 

Squad for the 2020–21 season

Goalkeepers
 13   Ariadna Gonzalez Peraza
 16  Maddi Aalla

Wingers
RW
 15  Maider Barros
 25  Anne Erauskin
LW 
   Isi Fernandez-Agustí
 5  Estibaliz Velasco
Line Players 
 7  Ainhoa Hernández
   Naia Puigbo 

Back players

LB
 22  June Loidi Etxaniz 
CB
 3  Alba Sánchez
 24  Ane Encina 
 55  Magdalena Fernandez-Agustí
RB
 8  Oihane Manrique 
 35  Maddi Bengoetxea Erriondo

Transfers
''Transfers for the 2020-2021

Joining

Leaving
  Amaia González de Garibay

Notable players 
  Mercedes Castellanos
  Naiara Egozkue
  Laura Steinbach
  Tania Yáñez

References

External links
 Official website
 EHF Club profile

Basque handball clubs
Handball clubs established in 1990
Barakaldo
Sport in Biscay
Spanish handball clubs